Dick "Cookie" Voorn (born 30 October 1948 in Uithoorn, North Holland) is a football coach. Until recently he was one of the assistant managers at the Dutch national team.

Voorn made his first steps in professional football in the 1990s when he became assistant manager at Fortuna Sittard where he worked alongside Bert van Marwijk. The two, as well as rehabilitation coach Egid Kiesouw became close friends and a dynamic trio. Together they brought Fortuna Sittard into the 1999 KNVB Cup final.

Van Marwijk left Fortuna and moved to Feyenoord Rotterdam where he would win the UEFA Cup. After that success he went to the Bundesliga to manage the team Feyenoord beat in the UEFA Cup final, Borussia Dortmund. Van Marwijk appointed his own staff and both Kiesouw and Voorn were appointed. The financial situation at the club was tough and the trio did all they could to get the best out of the team. They succeeded, although they were unable to earn any prizes. When Van Marwijk and Dortmund split up during the 2006-07 season Voorn and Kiesouw remained at the club until the end of the season.

During the summer break Van Marwijk returned to Feyenoord and technical director Peter Bosz let him appoint his own staff, which meant Voorn and Kiesouw re-joined Van Marwijk in his mission to bring Feyenoord back to the top.

References

External links
 

1948 births
Living people
People from Uithoorn
Dutch football managers
Borussia Dortmund non-playing staff
Feyenoord non-playing staff
Association football coaches
Dutch expatriate sportspeople in Germany
Sportspeople from North Holland